Trimethyl orthoformate (TMOF) is the organic compound with the formula HC(OCH3)3. A colorless liquid, it is the simplest orthoester.  It is a reagent used in organic synthesis for the formation of methyl ethers. The product of reaction of an aldehyde with trimethyl orthoformate is an acetal. In general cases, these acetals can be deprotected back to the aldehyde by using hydrochloric acid.

Synthesis
Trimethyl orthoformate is prepared on an industrial scale by the methanolysis of hydrogen cyanide:
HCN +  3 HOCH3  →  HC(OCH3)3  +  NH3

Trimethyl orthoformate can also be prepared from the reaction between chloroform and sodium methoxide, an example of the Williamson ether synthesis.

Use
Trimethyl orthoformate is a useful building block for creating methoxymethylene groups and heterocyclic ring systems. It introduces a formyl group to a nucleophilic substrate, e.g. RNH2 to form R-NH-CHO, which can undergo further reactions. It is used in the production of the fungicides, azoxystrobin, and picoxystrobin, as well as for some members of the floxacin family of antibacterial drugs. 

A number of pharmaceutical intermediates are also made from trimethyl orthoformate.

Trimethyl orthoformate is also an effective reagent for converting compatible carboxylic acids to their corresponding methyl esters. Alternatively, acid-catalyzed esterifications with methanol can be driven closer to completion by employing trimethyl orthoformate to convert water byproduct to methanol and methyl formate.

See also
Pinner reaction

References

Reagents for organic chemistry
Orthoesters
Methyl esters